The women's 800 metres event at the 2006 African Championships in Athletics was held at the Stade Germain Comarmond on August 12–13.

Medalists

Results

Heats

Final

References
Results 

2006 African Championships in Athletics
800 metres at the African Championships in Athletics
2006 in women's athletics